All in One or All-in-One may refer to:

Computing
 All-in-one PC, a desktop computer with the monitor and computer in the same case
 All-in-one printer or multifunction printer
 ALL-IN-1, an office automation software package from Digital Equipment Corporation
 MySAP All-in-One, business software from SAP
 Power Macintosh G3 All-in-One

Other uses
 All in One (film), a 1938 short film
 All in One (Bebel Gilberto album)
 All in One (Karen Clark Sheard album)
 All in One (Whigfield album)
 "All in One (5 Mics)", a song by Reks from Grey Hairs
 One-piece (disambiguation)

See also
 AIO (disambiguation)